Hervé Lhommedet (born September 28, 1973 in Poitiers, France) is a former professional footballer who played as a defensive midfielder.

See also
Football in France
List of football clubs in France

References

External links
Hervé Lhommedet profile at chamoisfc79.fr

1973 births
Living people
French footballers
Association football defenders
Chamois Niortais F.C. players
Ligue 2 players